Combe Hill is a summit in Berkshire, England, with a maximum elevation of .

The hill lies within the civil parishes of Combe (which includes the summit), East Woodhay and Faccombe. Combe is within the unitary authority area of West Berkshire and the ceremonial county of Berkshire, East Woodhay is within the district of Basingstoke and Deane in the administrative county of Hampshire, and Faccombe is in the Hampshire district of Test Valley.

References

Hills of Berkshire